Suzanne Neve (born 6 September 1939) is an English actress who appeared regularly on British television during the 1960s, including the lead role of Isabel Archer in the BBC's 1968 adaptation of Henry James's The Portrait of a Lady, for which she won Outstanding Television Personality in the Pye Colour Television Awards.

Neve first came to public attention as Ethel Brown in a 1962 series based on the William books of Richmal Crompton.  She subsequently had leading roles in Smuggler's Bay (1964) and as Fleur de Lys in a dramatisation of The Hunchback of Notre Dame (1966). Her big break came with the BBC's flagship production of The Forsyte Saga (1967), in which she played Holly Forsyte.

Following Portrait of a Lady, Neve continued to appear in television dramas, including further adaptations of the classics, such as Bel-Ami (1971). She also had a recurring role as Mary, the wife of Commander Straker, in the science fiction series UFO (1970–71). 
 
Neve appeared in several films including Play It Cool (1962), Naked Evil (1966), Mosquito Squadron (1969) and Scrooge (1970). Her last screen appearance was in the series Spooky (1983). The latter part of Neve's working life has been as a teacher of drama.

References

IMDb entry
 

1939 births
English television actresses
Living people